Local elections were held at Manila on May 9, 2022, as part of the Philippine general election. Held concurrently with the national elections, the electorate voted to elect a mayor, a vice mayor, thirty-six city council members and six district representatives to congress. Those elected took their respective offices on June 30, 2022, for a three-year-long term. 886,133 of 1,133,042 registered voters voted in this election.

Vice mayor Honey Lacuna and representative Yul Servo were elected to the mayoralty and vice mayoralty respectively, with Lacuna becoming the first woman to be elected to the office. The Asenso Manileño party became the only party represented in the city council after winning 34 seats in the legislature. The remaining two seats were won by independents Ninong Lacsamana of the 2nd district and Bobby Espiritu II of the 5th district.

Ernix Dionisio Jr., Rolan Valeriano, Joel Chua, Edward Maceda, Irwin Tieng and Benny Abante were elected to be the representatives for the first, second, third, fourth, fifth and sixth districts respectively.

Electoral system 
Elections for mayor, vice mayor and for the six members of the House of Representatives are via first-past-the-post voting. For members of the city council, it is via multiple non-transferable vote, with the candidates with six highest votes winning.

Elections for mayor and vice mayor are done at an at-large basis. Elections for members of the House of Representatives of the Philippines and the Manila City Council are via the legislative districts of Manila.

There are an additional two ex officio seats in the city council, for the city federation presidents of the Liga ng mga Barangay (village councilors league) and the Sangguniang Kabataan (youth council league). These were originally elected in 2018, and whose terms were extended until 2023. Separate elections for these bodies will be in October 2023.

Background 
Mayor Isko Moreno and Vice Mayor Honey Lacuna are the incumbents; both are members of Aksyon Demokratiko and the local party Asenso Manileño. Moreno was elected in 2019, defeating incumbent Mayor Joseph Estrada, while Lacuna was elected in 2016, succeeding Moreno.

Moreno chose not to seek reelection as the mayor of Manila and will instead run for president of the Philippines in 2022. Asenso Manileño nominated Lacuna and incumbent 3rd district representative Yul Servo Nieto for mayor and vice mayor, respectively.
Lacuna's notable challengers for mayor are former Philippine National Police DICTM deputy director Elmer Jamias (People's Reform Party), former 5th district representative Amado Bagatsing (KABAKA), and Christy Lim-Raymundo (Reporma), the daughter of former mayor Alfredo Lim, who died in 2020. Bagatsing is the son of another former mayor, Ramon Bagatsing. In 2019, Jamias lost the vice mayoralty race, while Lim-Raymundo lost the city council election. Alex Lopez (Partido Federal ng Pilipinas), the son of former mayor Mel Lopez, later joined the mayoralty race on November 10, 2021, as a substitute to Calvin Punzalan. Lopez also lost the 2019 elections in the congressional race at the 2nd district. Bagatsing also joined the mayoralty race during the substitution period; he previously ran for mayor in 2001 and in 2016 but lost.

Meanwhile, in the vice mayoralty race, Nieto notably faced actor Raymond Bagatsing of Kilusang Bagong Lipunan. Bagatsing is the nephew of mayoral candidate Amado Bagatsing, making him a grandson of former mayor Ramon Bagatsing. Raymond Bagatsing was later chosen as the running mate of Alex Lopez.

Previous potential candidates for mayor included former president and Manila Mayor Joseph Estrada and incumbent 1st district representative Manny Lopez. Estrada lost to Moreno in 2019 and said in July of the same year that he would run again for mayor. However, he did not file his Certificate of Candidacy in October 2021. Meanwhile, Lopez, another son of former Manila Mayor Mel Lopez and the current chair of the House Committee on Metro Manila Development, was chosen by the PDP–Laban–Cusi wing as its mayoral candidate but chose to seek reelection for representative instead, with his brother Alex taking his place in the mayoralty race.

Candidates

Honey-Yul (Asenso Manileño/Aksyon Demokratiko)

Partido Federal ng Pilipinas

Partido para sa Demokratikong Reporma

People's Reform Party

Kabalikat ng Bayan sa Kaunlaran

Liberal Party

Partido Maharlika

PROMDI

United Nationalist Alliance

Independents

Opinion polling

Mayor

Vice Mayor

Results

Mayor 
The incumbent mayor is Isko Moreno, who was elected in 2019 with 50.15% of the vote. Moreno is eligible for re-election but has opted to run for the presidency of the Philippines.

Asenso Manileño, Moreno's party slated vice mayor Honey Lacuna to defend the position.

Vice Mayor 
The incumbent vice mayor is Honey Lacuna, who was re-elected in 2019 with 57.28% of the vote. Lacuna is eligible for re-election but has opted to run for mayor.

Asenso Manileño, Moreno's party slated 3rd District Representative Yul Servo to defend the position.

District representatives

1st District 
Manny Lopez is the incumbent. His opponents are Ernesto "Ernix" Dionisio Jr. and former Congressman Benjamin "Atong" Asilo.

2nd District 
Rolan Valeriano is the incumbent. His opponent is former Congressman Carlo Lopez.

3rd District 
Incumbent Yul Servo is not seeking reelection to run for Vice Mayor. His party's nominee is incumbent city majority floor leader and Councilor Joel Chua. His opponents are former Councilor and incumbent Barangay 299 Captain Ramon Morales and Clark Field Arroño III.

4th District 
Edward Maceda is the incumbent. His opponents are former Congresswoman Trisha Bonoan-David and Christopher Gabriel, both happened to be his challengers in 2019.

5th District 
Amanda Cristina "Cristal" Bagatsing is the incumbent. Her opponent is Councilor Irwin Tieng.

6th District 
Benny Abante is the incumbent. His opponents are Romualdo "Bal" Billanes and Antonio Sityar II.

City Council

1st District 

 

|-
| colspan="5" style="background:black;"|

2nd District 

|-
| colspan="5" style="background:black;"|

3rd District 

|-
| colspan="5" style="background:black;"|

4th District 

|- 
| colspan="5" style="background:black;"|

5th District 

|- 
| colspan="5" style="background:black;"|

6th District 

|- 
| colspan="5" style="background:black;"|

Aftermath 
Alex Lopez filed an electoral protest against Honey Lacuna's mayoral victory, alleging “electoral frauds, irregularities, and anomalies” within the election. On October 6, 2022 The Commission on Elections dismissed the protest, citing the lack of evidence as well as the usage of baseless claims. Lacuna welcomed the decision.

References 

2022 Philippine local elections
Elections in Manila
May 2022 events in the Philippines
Politics of Manila
2022 elections in Metro Manila